The 1893 Chicago Maroons football team was an American football team that represented the University of Chicago during the 1893 college football season.  In their second season under head coach Amos Alonzo Stagg, the Maroons compiled a 6–4–2 record and were outscored by their opponents by a combined total of 143 to 142.

Schedule

Roster

Head coach: Amos Alonzo Stagg (2nd year at Chicago)

References

Chicago
Chicago Maroons football seasons
Chicago Maroons football